Save Our Selves is the name of a group of activists organized to raise awareness of global climate change. They are the organizers of the July 2007 Live Earth concerts.

The group was founded by Kevin Wall, and includes as major partners former United States Vice President Al Gore, the Alliance for Climate Protection, MSN and Control Room, a concert production company producing Live Earth.

See also 
An Inconvenient Truth
Hurricane Katrina
Action on climate change
Kyoto Protocol
Politics of global warming

External links
 Save Our Selves - Who we are, Live Earth website
 What's Music Got to Do with Climate Change? National Geographic July 6, 2007

Climate change organizations based in the United States